Marek Marušiak (born 19 September 1990) is a Slovak professional ice hockey player. Marušiak played with HK SKP Poprad in the Slovak Extraliga during the 2010–11 season and with the Paneuropa Kings of the European University Hockey League (EUHL) from the 2013-14 season to the 2015–16 season.

External links

Living people
HK Poprad players
Slovak ice hockey forwards
1990 births
Sportspeople from Poprad